WPFG may refer to:

World Police and Fire Games
WPFG (FM)